Comandante Luis Piedrabuena  is a town with 4,175 inhabitants in the department of Corpen Aike in Santa Cruz province in Argentina.

Located on the left bank of the Santa Cruz river on Ruta Nacional N° 3, it is 231 km from the city of Río Gallegos and 467 km from Caleta Olivia.

It was first settled by Argentina explorer Luis Piedrabuena in 1859, who established a town on Pavón Island.

It was given its present name in 1933.

External links

 Website for the city
 Federal website of IFAM

Ports and harbours of Argentina
Populated places in Santa Cruz Province, Argentina
Cities in Argentina
Argentina
Santa Cruz Province, Argentina